Royal Air Force Stanton Harcourt or more simply RAF Stanton Harcourt is a former Royal Air Force satellite station located  southeast of Witney, Oxfordshire and  west of Oxford, Oxfordshire, UK.

Units
The following units were here at some point:
No. 10 Operational Training Unit RAF
No. 20 OTU
No. 1341 (Special Duties) Flight RAF
No. 1501 (Beam Approach Training) Flight RAF
No. 1682 (Bomber) Defence Training Flight RAF
During the Second World War it was a satellite aerodrome for RAF Abingdon, to where No. 10 OTU crews would be sent once initial training was completed at Abingdon.

Current use

The site is now used for light industrial work and gravel pits.

See also
 List of former Royal Air Force stations

References

Stanton Harcourt